D. fimbriata may refer to:

Daphnellopsis fimbriata, a sea snail species
Diloxia fimbriata, a moth species
Drosera fimbriata, a carnivorous plant species